Danthorpe is a hamlet in the civil parish of Elstronwick and the East Riding of Yorkshire, England, and in an area known as Holderness.

Danthorpe is centred on Southfield Lane, the road running from Burton Pidsea to Humbleton, and just south of its junction with Back Lane running 1 mile west to the parish village of Elstronwick.

Danthorpe is listed in the Domesday Book as 'Danetorp', in the Hundred of Holderness, and was of 5.2 geld units—taxable units assessed by hide area—and contained one ploughland, 3.8 households, and one smallholder. In 1066 the lordship was held by the Canons  of Beverley St John, who held thirty-three manors in the east of Yorkshire under the overlordship of Ealdred, Archbishop of York. This lordship was retained by the Beverley canons in 1086, under the following archbishop of York, Thomas of Bayeux, who was also Tenant-in-chief to king William I.

In 1823, Baines recorded that Danthorpe was in the parish of Humbleton, and the wapentake and the liberty of Holderness, and had a population of 56 including a corn miller and three farmers.

At the east of Danthorpe is the farm of the Grade II listed Danthorpe Hall. The hall dates to the late 17th century, with 18th- and 19th-century wing additions, and is built of red brick with pebbledash rendering.

References

External links

Villages in the East Riding of Yorkshire
Holderness